Živorad "Žika" Jelić (born 7 December 1942) is a Serbian rock musician. He is best known as being the guitarist for the Serbian rock band YU Grupa, which he formed in 1970 with his younger brother Dragi.

During the 1960s, alongside his brother, Jelić was also a member of the beat band Džentlmeni.

Discography

With Džentlmeni

Extended plays
Idi (1968)
Slomljena srca (1969)

Singles
"Ona je moja" (1970)

Compilation albums
Antologija (2006)

With YU Grupa

References

1942 births
Living people
Musicians from Kraljevo
Serbian rock guitarists
Serbian rock bass guitarists
Lead guitarists
Serbian rock singers
20th-century Serbian male singers
Yugoslav rock singers
Yugoslav male singers